Ellington Township may refer to the following places in the United States:

 Ellington Township, Adams County, Illinois
 Ellington Township, Palo Alto County, Iowa
 Ellington Township, Michigan
 Ellington Township, Minnesota

Township name disambiguation pages